Colombia at the Summer Olympics in 1932 in Los Angeles, California was under the auspices of the International Olympic Committee (IOC); Columbia would not establish a national Olympic committee. So, Colombian long distance runner Jorge Perry contacted the IOC and was invited at the expense of the IOC to come to Los Angeles to train and compete at the ninth edition of the Summer Olympic Games. Colombian musician Emirto de Lima would also appear at the ninth edition of the Summer Olympics but in the events concerning the arts rather than sports. The arts events would eventually be eliminated from the competition. Perry trained in Los Angeles four months before the opening of the Olympic Games. Perry would never complete the marathon. Instead, he fainted at the 10 km race point.

Athletics

See also
Sports in Colombia

References
Official Olympic Reports

Colombia
1932 Summer Olympics